Major General Robert Sedgwick (c. 1611 – 1656) was an English colonist, born 1611 in Woburn, Bedfordshire, England, and baptised on 6 May 1613.

Biography
He was the son of William Sedgwick of London, and brother of English priest William Sedgwick. 
He has been identified with the Sedgwick who came over to New England in 1635, in the ship Truelove, aged 24, although in the record of the custom house his name is written 'Jo.' instead of 'Ro.' Sedgwick. 
He was made a freeman of Massachusetts on 9 March 1637.

Sedgwick, who had some military training, and is said by Edward Johnson to have been 'nurst up in London's Artillery garden,' was chosen captain of the Charlestown trained band, and was, in 1638, one of the founders of 'The Military Company of Massachusetts.' 
His name is the third in the foundation charter. 
He was commander of the Castle in Boston Harbour in 1641, and was major-general of the Massachusetts forces in 1652.
He ordered the building of Castle William, the first fort at Boston.

In 1653, Sedgwick was in England, and Cromwell selected him to command an expedition intended to drive the Dutch from New Netherland, giving him the rank of major in the army. 
He raised, in spite of various obstructions, a few hundred men in the New England colonies, and was about to set out against the Dutch (June 1654), when news of the peace with Holland put a stop to his proceedings. 
On this, Sedgwick turned his forces against the French in Acadia, captured their forts of St. John's and Port Royal, and a settlement at Penobscot, and added Acadia to the British dominions.

In the summer of 1655, after the conquest of Jamaica, the Protector appointed Sedgwick one of the civil commissioners for the government of his new acquisition. 
The instructions describe him still merely as 'Major Sedgwick,' but it is evident that Cromwell relied much on his experience of colonial life and his influence in New England. 
In October 1655, when Sedgwick arrived at Jamaica, he found the troops dying fast, everything in disorder, and necessaries of every kind wanting. 
"You must in a manner begin the work over again" was his message to Cromwell; but, though inwardly desponding of the future of the colony, he kept a brave front to the public, and under his energetic and judicious administration things slowly mended. 
Cromwell rewarded his zeal by sending him a commission as major-general and commander-in-chief, which reached Jamaica early in May 1656. 
But Sedgwick never took up the command, died on 24 May 1656, and was buried halfway up the canyon to Spanish Town from Ocho Rios in a small Christopher Wren-styled chapel.

Assessment
According to his secretary, the new responsibility imposed upon him aggravated his illness and brought him to his grave. 
'There is so much expected of me,' said he, 'and I, conscious of my own disabilities, having besides so untoward a people to deal with, am able to perform so little, that I shall never overcome it; it will break my heart'. 
The secretary describes Sedgwick as being 'generally beloved and esteemed by all sorts of people,' and Carlyle characterises him as 'a very brave, zealous, and pious man, whose letters in Thurloe are, of all others, the best worth reading on this subject.'

Family
Sedgwick left a widow, Joanna, and five children. 
The Protector granted her a pension of £100 per annum, and ordered her husband's arrears to be paid to her.

Sedgwick, Maine, was named in his honour.

References

Attribution

External links
 
 

Kingdom of England emigrants to Massachusetts Bay Colony
17th-century American businesspeople
English generals
Governors of Jamaica
Sedgwick family
1610s births
1656 deaths
People from Woburn, Bedfordshire
Members of the colonial Massachusetts House of Representatives
Military personnel from Bedfordshire